Marcos Moneta (born 7 March 2000) is an Argentine rugby sevens player. He made his debut appearance at the Olympics representing Argentina at the 2020 Summer Olympics. Moneta received World Rugby's Men’s Sevens Player of the Year award for 2021.

Career 
Moneta represented Argentina at the 2018 Summer Youth Olympics and was part of the Argentine team which defeated France 24-14 in the final to claim the gold medal in the boys rugby sevens tournament. He was also named in Argentine senior rugby sevens squad for the 2018–19 World Rugby Sevens Series. In 2021, he scored a hattrick of tries in a match against Kenya in the final of the Mi Visión del Juego final and was also the MVP of the tournament.

Moneta was also selected to Argentina squad to compete at the 2020 Summer Olympics in the men's rugby sevens tournament. He was also subsequently part of the Argentine side which claimed bronze medal after defeating Great Britain 17-12 in the third place match at the 2020 Summer Olympics. It was also the first ever Olympic medal for Argentina in rugby sevens.

Moneta competed for Argentina at the 2022 Rugby World Cup Sevens in Cape Town.

References 

Jaguares (Super Rugby) players
Rugby union fullbacks
Argentine rugby union players
Argentine rugby sevens players
2000 births
Living people
Rugby sevens players at the 2018 Summer Youth Olympics
Youth Olympic gold medalists for Argentina
Rugby sevens players at the 2020 Summer Olympics
Olympic rugby sevens players of Argentina
Olympic bronze medalists for Argentina
Olympic medalists in rugby sevens
Medalists at the 2020 Summer Olympics
Sportspeople from Buenos Aires